Provincial Road 213 (PR 213), more commonly known as Garven Road, is a provincial road in the province of Manitoba, Canada.  The road is located in the Rural Municipality (RM) of Springfield, with the westernmost part forming part of the boundary between the RMs of Springfield and East St. Paul.

Route description
It is a heavily-used road linking Winnipeg with the communities of Oakbank, Hazelridge, and Cooks Creek, as well as the eastern gate of Birds Hill Provincial Park (via PR 206). Garven Road itself continues as municipal roads from both ends of PR 213, although the road west of PTH 59 is interrupted by the Red River Floodway.

A roundabout is scheduled to be installed at the PR 206/213 junction.

References

External links
Official Manitoba Highway Map

213